Jeong Jin-hyeok (born June 1, 1991, Chungcheongnam) is a South Korean long-distance runner. At the 2012 Summer Olympics, he competed in the Men's marathon, finishing in 82nd place.

References

1991 births
Living people
South Korean male long-distance runners
South Korean male marathon runners
Olympic athletes of South Korea
Athletes (track and field) at the 2012 Summer Olympics
World Athletics Championships athletes for South Korea

Sportspeople from South Chungcheong Province
21st-century South Korean people